The Central District of Torbat-e Heydarieh County is a district (bakhsh) in Torbat-e Heydarieh County, Razavi Khorasan Province, Iran. At the 2006 census, its population was 150,643, in 40,349 families.  The District has one city: Torbat-e Heydarieh. The District has two rural districts (dehestan): Bala Velayat Rural District and Pain Velayat Rural District.

References 

Districts of Razavi Khorasan Province
Torbat-e Heydarieh County